Ali Mohammad Al-Hussein Ali Al-Adeeb is an Iraqi politician and a senior member of the Islamic Dawa Party. In April 2006 he was tipped by the United Iraqi Alliance as a candidate for the post of Prime Minister, after their original choice, Ibrahim Jaafari, was vetoed by the Kurdistani Alliance and Iraqi Accord Front.

Adeeb was born in Karbala in 1944 and went to secondary school in Baghdad. He obtained a degree in Literature and Education from the Baghdad University and taught Psychology.

While Saddam Hussein was the President of Iraq, Adeeb was exiled to Iran, where he headed the Teheran-based Political Bureau of the Dawa party and took the nickname "Abu Bilal". He returned to Iraq in 2003 after the invasion.

Adeeb was appointed to the committee that drafted the Constitution of Iraq in 2004, and has been a member of the Iraqi Parliament since 2005.

Sources 
 Profile

References 

1944 births
Living people
Members of the Council of Representatives of Iraq
Politicians from Karbala
Iraqi Shia Muslims
Islamic Dawa Party politicians
Government ministers of Iraq
University of Baghdad alumni
Al-Mustansiriya University alumni